Kamaal is a given name. Notable people with this name include:

Kamaal Amrohi (1918–1993), Indian film director and screenwriter
Kamaal Fareed or Q-Tip (musician) (born 1970), American rapper, record producer, singer, actor and DJ
Kamaal R. Khan, Indian film actor, producer and writer
Kamaal Williams (born 1989), British musician and record producer

See also
Kamahl
Kamal (disambiguation)
Kamala (disambiguation)
Kamale
Kammal